Aglaia rugulosa is a species of flowering plant in the family Meliaceae. It is found in Indonesia and Malaysia.

References

rugulosa
Near threatened plants
Taxonomy articles created by Polbot